The 1987 Fuji  500 was the eleventh and final round of the inaugural World Touring Car Championship. The race was held for cars eligible for Group A touring car regulations. It was held on November 15, 1987, at the Fuji Speedway in  Oyama, Japan.

Official results

Italics indicate driver practiced this car but did not race.

References

Statistics
 Pole Position - #7 Klaus Ludwig - 1:36.981
 Fastest Lap - #7 Klaus Ludwig - 1:39.249

External links
 www.touringcarracing.net 
 Volvo 240 Turbo Group 'A' Racing Information

Auto races in Japan
Fuji 500
Fuji 500